James L. Swanson (born February 12, 1959) is an American author and historian famous for his New York Times best-seller Manhunt: The 12-Day Chase for Lincoln's Killer, focusing on the biography of John Wilkes Boothe and his plot to kill Lincoln and other cabinet members. For this book he earned an Edgar Award.  He is currently a Senior Fellow at the American Heritage foundation and in the past has appeared on C-SPAN on behalf of the Koch-affiliated libertarian CATO Institute think tank.

Education
Swanson graduated from the University of Chicago with a bachelor's degree in history and from the University of California, Los Angeles School of Law with a J.D. degree. Swanson also has degrees in history and law from the UCLA and the University of Chicago. He has held a number of government and think-tank posts in Washington, D.C., including at the United States Department of Justice. He serves on the advisory council of the Ford's Theatre Society.

Career
Swanson is an Abraham Lincoln scholar and is a member of the Lincoln Bicentennial Commission. His main area of research is on the Lincoln assassination. He has also served in the U.S. Department of Justice.

Bibliography

Books

 Manhunt: The 12-Day Chase for Lincoln's Killer. 2007.  
 Chasing Lincoln's Killer: The Search for John Wilkes Booth.2008. 
 Bloody Times: the Funeral for Abraham Lincoln and the Manhunt for Jefferson Davis. 2010. 
 Bloody Crimes: The Chase for Jefferson Davis and the Death Pageant for Lincoln's Corpse. 2010. 
 "The President Has Been Shot!": The Assassination of John F. Kennedy. 2013.  
 End of Days: The Assassination of John F. Kennedy 2013.  .
 Chasing King's Killer:  The Hunt for Martin Luther King, Jr.'s Assassin, 2018.

References

External links 
 
 Fairfax Network: Guest Authors
 Library of Congress: James L. Swanson
 Biography: James L. Swanson
 James L. Swanson Bibliography

1959 births
Living people
21st-century American historians
21st-century American male writers
University of Chicago alumni
UCLA School of Law alumni
Abraham Lincoln
American male non-fiction writers